PQ3 or variation, may refer to:

 Convoy PQ 3, WWII Allied Arctic Convoy
 Police Quest III: The Kindred, video game
 PQ3, a rating used for the UK Royal Mail in Address Point

See also
 PQ (disambiguation)